Leonard Alexander Salmon (24 June 1912 – February 1995) was an English professional footballer who played in the Football League for New Brighton and Tranmere Rovers as a wing half.

References

Tranmere Rovers F.C. players
New Brighton A.F.C. players
Burnley F.C. players
English Football League players
Association football wing halves
1912 births
1995 deaths
English footballers
People from West Kirby
South Liverpool F.C. players
Fulham F.C. wartime guest players
Aldershot F.C. wartime guest players
Charlton Athletic F.C. wartime guest players
Millwall F.C. wartime guest players
Clapton Orient F.C. wartime guest players